Saint Patrick Church is a historic building and the second-oldest Catholic church building in Columbus, Ohio.  Located in the Discovery District neighborhood, the structure served as the pro-cathedral of the Roman Catholic Diocese of Columbus until the consecration of Saint Joseph Cathedral.  It has been served by priests of the Dominican Order since 1885 and is currently home to an active parish.

History
When Irish Catholic immigrants arrived in Columbus in 1848 to escape the Great Famine, the only Catholic church in the city was Holy Cross Church, a predominantly German Catholic parish.  The German and Irish worshipers shared Holy Cross until 1850, when the parish voted to split.  Archbishop Purcell of Cincinnati approved the new parish February 1851 and appointed Reverend John Furlong as its pastor. The lot on which the church stands was purchased from Robert E. Neill for $1000. 

The new parish was named for Ireland's patron saint, Saint Patrick.  The site chosen was on the west side of town at the corner of Grant and Naghten Streets (then known as the "Irish Broadway"). English-speaking worshipers continued attending Holy Cross during construction, with $1,200 toward the building fund donated by Holy Cross parishioners. it was the first Catholic church in Columbus to have a bell, which was acquired in around 1865.

Aquinas High School 
in 1905, bishop James Hartley requested that the Dominican Fathers open a high school. Initially called St. Patrick High School and housed in the parochial school building at the corner of Grant and Mt. Vernon, it was renamed Aquinas High School and relocated to a dedicated building in 1912. It was the largest high school in the Diocese into the mid-20th century, until the need for new facilities and lack of personnel due to the Vatican asking for more of the Dominican Fathers to enter missionary work resulted in the announcing of the closure of the school in 1962. The final class graduated in 1965 and the school building was sold to the Columbus Board of Education. It is currently used by Columbus State Community College.

Notable clergy

{| class="wikitable"
|+ 
! Notable Clergyman !! Office / Appointment
|-
| Sylvester Horton Rosecrans || Bishop of Columbus (1868–1878)
|-
| Edward Fitzgerald || Bishop of Little Rock (1822–1832)
|-
| Nicolaus Aloysius Gallagher || Bishop of Galveston (1882–1918)
|- 
| Michael Dosch || Missionary of Mercy (2015–2016)
|- 
| Cassian Derbes || Missionary of Mercy (2015–2016)
|- 
| Thomas Blau || Missionary of Mercy (2015–2016)
|- 
| Boniface Endorf || Missionary of Mercy (2015–2016)
|}

Interior

Stained glass windows

{| class="wikitable"
|+ 
! colspan=12 | Subjects of stained glass windows as arranged from east to west
|-
! North Side !! South Side
|-
! colspan=12 | Apse
|-
| Saint Dominic receiving the Rosary from the Virgin Mary || Saint Patrick explaining the Trinity
|-
! colspan=12 | Nave
|-
| The Last Supper || The Presentation of Jesus at the Temple
|-
| The Annunciation || The Resurrection of Jesus
|- 
| Sacred Heart of Jesus appearing to St. Margaret Mary || Death of Saint Joseph
|- 
| The Marriage at Cana || The Anointing of Jesus
|- 
| Saint Patrick's baptism of the High King of Ireland || Jesus on a crucifix speaking to Saint Thomas Aquinas
|- 
| non-pictorial window over a door || Saints Vincent de Paul and Anthony of Padua
|}

Paintings
There is a fresco of a medallion depicting a Dominican saint over each stained glass window in the nave.

{| class="wikitable"
|+ 
! colspan=12 | Subjects of the medallion frescos as arranged from east to west
|-
! North Side !! South Side
|-
| Saint Thomas Aquinas || Saint Dominic
|-
| Saint Catherine of Siena || Saint Rose of Lima
|-
| Saint Antoninus || Pope Saint Pius V
|- 
| Saint Agnes || Saint Catherine de Ricci
|- 
| Saint Vincent Ferrer || Saint Hyacinth
|- 
| Blessed Pier Giorgio Frassati || Saint Gianna Beretta Molla
|}

References

Roman Catholic churches in Columbus, Ohio
Roman Catholic churches completed in 1853
Dominican churches in the United States
Gothic Revival architecture in Ohio
Buildings in downtown Columbus, Ohio
19th-century Roman Catholic church buildings in the United States